Minuscule 430 (in the Gregory-Aland numbering), Νι11 (in the Soden numbering), is a Greek minuscule manuscript of the New Testament, on a parchment. Palaeographically it has been assigned to the 11th century.

Description 

The codex contains only the text of the Gospel of John 1:1-8:14 on 366 parchment leaves. It is written in one column per page, in 24 lines per page. The biblical text is surrounded by Nicetas' catena.

Kurt Aland did not place the Greek text of the codex in any Category.

History 

The manuscript was bought in 1590 by Leontius from Cyprus for Martin Crusius of Tübingen. Crusius sent it to the library at Augsburg. 
It was added to the list of the New Testament manuscripts by Scholz (1794–1852).
C. R. Gregory saw it in 1887.

It is currently housed at the Bavarian State Library (Gr. 437) in Munich.

See also 

 List of New Testament minuscules
 Biblical manuscript
 Textual criticism

References

Further reading

External links 
 Minuscule 430 at the Encyclopedia of Textual Criticism

Greek New Testament minuscules
11th-century biblical manuscripts